Soffici is a surname. Notable people with the surname include:

Ardengo Soffici (1879–1964), Italian writer, painter, poet, sculptor and intellectual
Filippo Soffici (born 1970), Italian rower
Juan Soffici, Argentine film editor
Mario Soffici (1900–1977), Italian-born Argentine film director, actor and screenwriter
Roberto Soffici (born 1946), Italian pop singer-songwriter, composer and lyricist